is a romance visual novel, the sequel to First Kiss Story. It was released for the Dreamcast on August 8, 2002. It is also part of the PlayStation 2 enhanced port titled First Kiss Stories.

Notes

References 

2002 video games
Dreamcast games
HuneX games
Japan-exclusive video games
PlayStation 2 games
Single-player video games
Video game remakes
Video games developed in Japan
Visual novels
Broccoli (company) games
ja:ファーストKiss☆物語